Evan Hansen (born July 22, 1966) is an American politician, currently serving as a Democratic member of the West Virginia House of Delegates since 2018, representing the 51st district, which includes Morgantown and the majority of Monongalia County.

Politics 
Hansen was first elected to the House during the 2018 elections, which saw Democrats gain in both chambers of the West Virginia Legislature.

Hansen was an unsuccessful candidate for the House in the 2016 elections, coming in sixth place behind Democrat Barbara Evans Fleischauer, Republican Cindy Frich, Republican Joe Statler, Democrat John Williams, and Democrat Rodney Pyles in the five-member 51st District.

In 2018, Democrats — including Hansen — swept all five seats in the 51st district, the largest multi-member district in the House. As a result, the Monongalia County delegates, all Democrats, called themselves “The Fab Five” and frequently voted and worked together on bills. This was especially notable given that there was only one Democratic member of the delegation just four years earlier, after the 2014 elections. In 2020, fellow Delegate Rodney Pyles was defeated for re-election by former Republican Delegate Joe Statler, breaking the all-Democratic delegation.

Personal life 
Hansen was born on July 22, 1966, in Newark, New Jersey to Eleanor and Edwin Hansen. He obtained a B.S. in Computer Science and Engineering from Massachusetts Institute of Technology and an M.S. in Energy and Resources, University of California-Berkeley. Hansen is also Jewish.

Hansen is co-owner of Downstream Strategies in Morgantown, which works with government agencies, cities, counties, and nonprofits on projects related to drinking water protection, energy development, and local economic development. Hansen has lived in Morgantown since 1997.

Electoral history

2018 election

Primary election

General election

2020 election

Primary election

General election

References

External links 

 Official website
 Evan Hansen at West Virginia Legislature
 Evan Hansen at Ballotpedia

1966 births
Living people
21st-century American politicians
Democratic Party members of the West Virginia House of Delegates
Politicians from Morgantown, West Virginia
Politicians from Newark, New Jersey